Sunishma Singh is a climate activist from Fiji. She was also the youth representative from Fiji for COP 25.

Early life and education 
Sing lives in Nagroga. She studying in DAV College Suva and continued her school at University of the South Pacific by taking geospatial science and geography course.She graduated in April 2021.

Activism 
When she was 19 years old, she participates in Hibiscus queen with Cal Valley Solar as the sponsor. She is part of Fiji Youth council which is consist of youth from ages 15 to 35 years old who works with Ministry of Youth and Sport as social media co-ordinator. On the event of COP 25, she became one of the youth representatives from Fiji with Apenisa Vaniqi, Stephen Simon, Shivani Karan and Otto Navunicagi.

Career 
Currently, she is  Resilience officer in United Nations Human Settlements Programme which located in Lami Town Council.

Reference 

Living people
Year of birth missing (living people)
University of the South Pacific alumni
Women environmentalists
Climate activists
Fijian environmentalists